The chestnut-crowned becard (Pachyramphus castaneus) is a species of bird in the family Tityridae. It has traditionally been placed in Cotingidae or Tyrannidae, but evidence strongly suggest it is better placed in Tityridae, where it is now placed by the South American Classification Committee.

It is found in the Amazon Basin of Brazil, Colombia, Peru, Ecuador, and Bolivia and regions of Venezuela; also southeastern regions of South America including Brazil, Paraguay, and very northeastern Argentina. Its natural habitats are subtropical or tropical moist lowland forests, subtropical or tropical moist montane forests, and heavily degraded former forest.

Distribution
The chestnut-crowned becard has two major ranges in South America: the Amazon Basin, mostly the south and center-west, and the Cerrado region of Brazil.

The Cerrado range is in southeastern South America and also covers large areas of coastal Brazil; the range goes from southern Northeast Region, Brazil to the Southeast region, and includes the eastern Center-West region. From northeast to southeast, the range extends about 2600 km.

The range in the Amazon Basin, (about 3200 km), extends through the center regions of northwest and southwest and avoids most highlands-headwater regions of the very midpoint of the Basin. One of two exceptions is the headwater-upperland bordering southeast Venezuela with western Roraima state of North Region, Brazil, (the Amazon Basin); this disjunct range is 300 km by 900 km. The second exception is Caribbean coastal northern Venezuela, a smaller disjunct range.

The Amazon Basin range in the west extends to the Andean foothills and is contiguous from southern Colombia south through all eastern Ecuador, all of eastern Amazonian Peru, and parts of Bolivia, especially the extreme north at the headwater tributaries of the Madeira River. The Madeira River in southwestern Amazonas state Brazil is one southerly range limit, and the Rio Negro is the northwestern Amazon range limit. In the southeast Basin the eastern limit is the lower fourth of the adjacent drainage, the Araguaia-Tocantins River, (the upper fourth being in the SE Brazil Cerrado population). In the southeast Basin, only the downstream half of the river systems are in the contiguous range, (the Tapajós and Xingu Rivers).

References

External links
Chestnut-crowned Becard videos on the Internet Bird Collection
Chestnut-crowned Becard photo gallery VIREO Photo-High Res
Graphic: Pachyramphus castaneus--Medium Res; Article www.eln.gov.br—Birds of Brazil-"Familia Tyrannidae"
Photo-Medium Res; Article ib.usp.br—"Tityridae"
Photo-High Res; Article simonknightphotography.co.uk

chestnut-crowned becard
Birds of the Amazon Basin
Birds of Brazil
Birds of the Cerrado
Birds of Venezuela
chestnut-crowned becard
Taxonomy articles created by Polbot